Hangor S-131 is a Pakistani historical drama telefilm produced by iDream Entertainment and released on ARY Digital on 26 December 2021. It is written by Saji Gul and directed by Saqib Khan. The telefilm is based on a thrilling sea encounter inspired from the real incidents of 1971 Indo-Pak War. The film features Zahid Ahmed, Saba Qamar, Affan Waheed, Dur-e-Fishan Saleem, Hammad Shoaib, Arez Ahmed and Shehzad Sheikh in leading roles. The trailer of the film was released on 9 December 2021.

Cast
 Zahid Ahmed as Cdr Ahmad Tasnim
 Saba Qamar as Naheed Ahmad Tasneem
 Affan Waheed as Lt Cdr Obaidullah Khan
 Dur-e-Fishan Saleem as Sameera, a journalist and hadi's fiancee
 Hammad Shoaib as Lt Faseeh Bukhari
 Arez Ahmed as Lt Allaudin
 Shehzad Sheikh as Lt Cdr Hadi
 Naima Khan as Lt Allaudin's mother
 Haris Waheed as Lt Cdr Noori Pasha
 Maryam Fatima as Naseema Noori Pasha
 Javed Sheikh as Chief of Naval staff 1971
 Nida Mumtaz as Hadi's mother
 Adnan Shah Tipu as Navy cook 
 Nayyar Ejaz as Navy cook Gulsher's father
 Laila Wasti as Sameera's mother
 Paras Masroor as Navy cook Gulsher

Reception
The telefilm received 4.5 TRPs at its timeslot.

See Also 
 Laal (film)
 Sherdil
 Parwaaz Hai Junoon
 Waar

References

2021 Pakistani television series debuts
ARY Digital original programming
Indo-Pakistani War of 1971
Films based on Indo-Pakistani wars and conflicts